Rudolf S. Enblom (25 August 1861 – 27 February 1945) was a Swedish architect.

Biography
Rudolf Samuel Enblom was born in Hilleshög in Ekerö Municipality, Sweden. 
He studied at the Copenhagen Technical College and the Royal Danish Academy of Fine Arts in Copenhagen 1882–84. He was a student at the KTH Royal Institute of Technology in Stockholm from 1884 to 1886. He was a senior teacher in construction engineering at the Royal Institute of Technology in 1899–1932 and director of its construction school in 1925–32.  

His designed included  an apartment building at  Upplandsgatan in 1891, Kristallsalongen, an open-air theater at Djurgården in Stockholm in 1892 and   
Veterinary University buildings (now part of Swedish University of Agricultural Sciences)  in 1906–09.

References

1861 births
1945 deaths
People from Ekerö Municipality
Royal Danish Academy of Fine Arts alumni
KTH Royal Institute of Technology alumni
Academic staff of the KTH Royal Institute of Technology
Swedish architects